Solomon Islands competed at the 2020 Summer Olympics in Tokyo. Originally scheduled to take place from 24 July to 9 August 2020, the Games were postponed to 23 July to 8 August 2021, due to the COVID-19 pandemic. It was the nation's tenth appearance at the Summer Olympics.

Competitors
The following is the list of number of competitors in the Games.

Athletics

Solomon Islands received a universality slot from IAAF to send a female athlete to the Olympics.

Track & road events

Swimming

Solomon Islands received a universality invitation from FINA to send a male top-ranked swimmer in his respective individual events to the Olympics, based on the FINA Points System of June 28, 2021.

Weightlifting

Solomon Islands entered one female weightlifter into the Olympic competition. Mary Kini Lifu topped the list of weightlifters from Oceania in the women's 55 kg category based on the IWF Absolute Continental Rankings

References

Nations at the 2020 Summer Olympics
2020